Zeng Zhaolun (25 May 1899 – 8 December 1967), also known as Chao-Lun Tseng, was a Chinese chemist and politician who served as vice-minister of Education after the establishment of the Communist State in the 1950s. He was an academician of the Chinese Academy of Sciences (CAS).

Biography
Zeng was born in Heye, Shuangfeng County, Hunan, on January 27, 1909. His great-grandfather  was the second younger brother of Zeng Guofan and a general in the Qing Empire. His father Zeng Guangzuo was an official in the Qing Empire. His mother Chen Jiying was the daughter of Hunan Provincial Governor Chen Baozhen and the aunt of Chen Yinke. Zeng had seven brothers and sisters. His eldest brother Zeng Zhaocheng graduated from Harvard University. His younger brother Zeng Zhaojie graduated from the Great China University. His younger sister Zeng Zhaoyu graduated from the University of London and was an archaeologist and museologist.

After graduating from Tsinghua University in 1920, he pursued graduate studies at the Massachusetts Institute of Technology in the United States. After returning to China, he taught at the National Central University. In 1931 he became a professor at Peking University. In the summer of 1946, Wu Ta-You, Zeng Zhaolun and Hua Luogeng visited the United States to inspect the manufacturing process of the atomic bomb. After the defeat of the Nationalists by the Communists in Chinese Civil War in 1949, he chose to stay in mainland China.

After the founding of the People's Republic of China, Zeng was appointed Vice Minister of Education. In 1957, Zeng was labeled as a rightist during the Anti-Rightist Campaign. In March 1958, he was transferred to Wuhan University as a teacher. When the Cultural Revolution began in 1966, Zeng was persecuted as one of "Zeng Guofan's descendants". On August 25, 1966, his wife Yu Dayin committed suicide after being beaten and humiliated. On December 8, 1967, Zeng died of cancer at home.

Personal life
Zeng's wife Yu Dayin was a professor at the Department of English, Peking University.

References

1899 births
1967 deaths
Chemists from Hunan
Chinese expatriates in the United States
Educators from Hunan
Massachusetts Institute of Technology alumni
Members of the Chinese Academy of Sciences
Academic staff of the National Central University
Academic staff of Peking University
People's Republic of China politicians from Hunan
Politicians from Loudi
Tsinghua University alumni
Victims of the Anti-Rightist Campaign
Victims of the Cultural Revolution
Academic staff of Wuhan University